The 2009–10 Slovak 1.Liga season was the 17th season of the Slovak 1. Liga, the second level of ice hockey in Slovakia. 14 teams participated in the league, and SHK 37 Piestany won the championship.

Regular season

Playoffs

Quarterfinals

 ŠHK 37 Piešťany – MHK SkiPark Kežmarok 3 : 0  (4:3PP, 7:1, 8:2)
 HC 46 Bardejov – HK Brezno 3 : 0  (6:2, 5:3, 9:0)
 HC 07 Prešov – HK Trebišov 3 : 2  (4:2, 2:4, 3:4sn, 5:2,5:3)
 HK Trnava – HC Topoľčany 3 : 2  (1:4, 3:0, 4:3, 1:4,1:0)

Semifinals 

 ŠHK 37 Piešťany – HK Trnava 3 : 1 (5:1, 4:2, 2:7, 5:3)
 HC 46 Bardejov – HC 07 Prešov 0 : 3 (1:2, 1:3, 3:6)

Final
 ŠHK 37 Piešťany – HC 07 Prešov 4:3 (4:1, 5:3, 2:3PP, 1:0, 0:2, 2:4, 6:2)

External links
 Season on hockeyarchives.info

Slovak 1. Liga
Slovak 1. Liga seasons
4